Dr Blay Whitby is a philosopher and technology ethicist, specialising in computer science, artificial intelligence and robotics. He is based at the University of Sussex, England.

Blay Whitby graduated with first class honours from New College, Oxford University in 1974 and completed his PhD on "The Social Implications of Artificial Intelligence" at Middlesex University in 2003. His publications are predominantly in the area of the philosophy and ethical implications of artificial intelligence. His views place particular stress on the moral responsibilities of scientific and technical professionals, having some features in common with techno-progressivism. Widening engagement in science and increasing levels of debate in ethical issues is also an important concern.

Whitby is a member of the Ethics Strategic Panel of BCS, the Chartered Institute for IT. He also participates in art/science collaborations.

Selected publications
 Whitby, B.R. (2003), A.I. A Beginner's Guide, Oxford: OneWorld Publications.
 Whitby, B.R. (1996), Reflections on Artificial Intelligence: The Social, Legal, and Moral Dimensions, Oxford: Intellect Books.
 Whitby, B.R. (1988), A.I., A Handbook of Professionalism, Chichester: Ellis Horwood.

References

External links
 Blay Whitby website
 Centre for Research in Cognitive Science home page
 Interview with Blay Whitby

Year of birth missing (living people)
Living people
Alumni of New College, Oxford
Alumni of Middlesex University
Academics of the University of Sussex
British philosophers
Artificial intelligence researchers